The 2017 ISSF Junior World Cup is the annual edition of the ISSF Junior World Cup, governed by the International Shooting Sport Federation

Men's results

Shotgun Events

Individual Results

Women's Results

Shotgun Events

Individual Results

Medal table

References 

ISSF Junior World Cup
ISSF shooting competitions